The 2019 Democratic Party leadership election was an open primary election held on 3 March 2019. The election was triggered by the resignation of Matteo Renzi on 12 March 2018, following the party's defeat at the 2018 general election. Vice Secretary Maurizio Martina was appointed Secretary in July 2018 by the National Assembly, but he resigned after few months to officially start the party's congress.

Six candidates were successfully nominated to stand in the Club's Conventions, held in January: Nicola Zingaretti, Maurizio Martina, Roberto Giachetti, Francesco Boccia, Dario Corallo and Maria Saladino. The first three candidates advanced to the open primary election scheduled in March, where Zingaretti won by a landslide getting more than 66% of votes.

Electoral process
The process consists of two phases: the first one in which only the members of the Democratic Party have the right to vote, thus determining the candidates who will enter the second round, where the center-left sympathizers are able to vote too. The Democratic Party is currently the only party in Italy that allows the non-members to elect the Secretary by open primary.

The term of office of the Secretary is usually four years, along with the National Assembly, but when the former resign in advance, the National Assembly can choose between electing another Secretary (until the natural expiration of the mandate is reached) or the early dissolution of the National Assembly itself and the convocation of a new leadership election.

With the official resignation presented by Secretary Maurizio Martina on 30 October, the President must gather the members of the National Assembly within a month, which was held on 17 November on Rome after the convocation of the President, Matteo Orfini, officially starting the primaries. On the same day, the National Assembly elects the members of the “National Committee for the Congress” (which will act in place of the elected bodies until the end of the leadership election), that the National Assembly has to follow, through the approval of the “Rules of the Primaries” where are stated the rules, the dates and the procedure that the party must perform for the process of the leadership election. The National Committee also handle the internal disputes and appeals during the primary election.

After the assignment of the National Committee, their members elect a President to coordinate the activities, and they write the rules and the dates and propose them to the National Board. The election must take place within four months following the presentation of the resignation of the Secretary. On 28 November, the National Board unanimously approved the proposals made by the National Committee, setting the date of the leadership election on 3 March.

Requirements for candidacy
As stated in the Rules of the Primaries, to officially take part in the competition, applying candidates are required to gather signatures, by 6:00 PM on 12 December 2018, from either:
 10% of the members of the outgoing National Assembly;
 1,500 to 2,000 registered members of the Democratic Party located in no less than five regions belonging to at least three of the five Italian constituencies for the European Parliament.
Along with the signatures, candidates must provide their manifesto. In a few days, the National Committee will announce the official list of the candidates and will carry out a draw to generate the official order of presentation of the candidates in the ballots.

Closed primary
To be able to vote in this stage is required to be a member of the Democratic Party. The registration on the local branch closed on 28 November but it is still possible, if the member enrolled in for the previous year, to renew their membership of the party until the day their Circle Convention takes place. Along with the enrollment in the local branches, the National Committee approved the online enrollment, available only between 3 and 21 December for those who weren't members of the Democratic Party in the previous year. To prevent any electoral fraud, it is admitted to enroll only two people per credit card.

Once the candidates are validated by the National Committee, the local branches, in a day choose individually by every branch between 7 and 23 January 2019, gather their registered members in the Circle Conventions to talk about the candidates, their manifesto and to introduce the delegates who will take part at the Provincial Conventions. The number of the delegates elected per branch is fixed by the Provincial Committee, on the basis of the average membership of the branch between 2016 and 2017. Along with the national candidate, the members will vote for the delegates linked to every candidate.

The elected provincial delegates will take part in the Provincial Conventions in a date set between 29 or 30 January, to elect the delegates for the National Convention, each linked to a national candidate. Just like the Circle Conventions, the number of the delegates elected for every province are fixed by the National Committee, half on the basis of the result of the party in the latest election and half on the average membership of the province between 2016 and 2017. The National Convention will take place on 2 February; it's composed of 1,000 delegates, and it will announce the results of the votes that will be held in the Circle Conventions and will list the candidates admitted to the open primary and the National Assembly, according to one of these conditions:
the three most voted candidates above 5% of votes;
a candidate who gets at least 15% of votes in five different regions.

Open primary
Those interested in voting on 3 March for the election of the Secretary may present themselves at the polling station set up in a branch of the Democratic Party, where they can vote for the candidates, voting for one of the regional lists of delegates (who are elected proportionally to the votes obtained) for the National Assembly linked to the candidates. To take part in the election, voters have to:
show an ID card;
show a voter ID card (not requested to those who must enroll themselves online);
make a donation of €2 minimum (the members of the party are exempted, showing instead their membership card);
sign up a statement pledging to support the party and sign up the register members of the voters (not requested to the members of the party);
preregister themselves online (mandatory for students and workers residing out of town, off-site citizens, minors between 16 and 18 years old, EU citizens, foreign nationals with a permit to stay in Italy).
The renewed National Assembly meet up on 17 March to declare the elected Secretary, if he obtained the absolute majority of the delegates, otherwise, the delegates of the National Assembly will hold a run-off with a vote by secret ballot between the two most-voted candidates and determine the winner.

Timetable

Background
In the 2018 general election the Democratic Party, led by former Prime Minister Matteo Renzi, obtained its worst result ever: 18.7% of the vote, well behind the Five Star Movement (32.7%) and narrowly ahead of the League (17.4%). Following his party's defeat, Renzi resigned from secretary and his deputy Maurizio Martina started functioning as acting secretary.

After two months of negotiations and the refusal of the PD to join forces with the M5S, the latter and the League formed a yellow-green government, under Prime Minister Giuseppe Conte, a M5S-proposed independent. The PD thus returned to opposition after virtually seven years and experienced some internal turmoil as its internal factions started to re-position themselves in the new context. Both Paolo Gentiloni and Dario Franceschini distanced from Renzi, while Carlo Calenda, a former minister in Renzi's and Gentiloni's governments who had joined the party soon after the election, proposed to merge the PD into a larger "republican front". However, according to several observers, Renzi's grip over the party was still strong and he was still the PD's leader behind the scenes. In July 2018 Martina was elected secretary by the party's national assembly and a new leadership election was scheduled for the first semester of 2019.

Campaign

On 7 July 2018, the President of Lazio region, Nicola Zingaretti, announced his intention to run as party's secretary. Zingaretti was a former member of the Italian Communist Party (PCI) and Democratic Party of the Left (PDS), who served as leader of the Left Youth, the youth-wing of the PDS. He is considered a social democrat and one of the most prominent members of the PD's left-wing; for his leftist ideas, some journalists and political analysts compared him to Bernie Sanders and Jeremy Corbyn. Zingaretti's campaign was based on a social democratic platform, whose aim was to abandon the social liberal and centrist policies promoted by Matteo Renzi and to move the Democratic Party more on the left. The campaign's main themes were social justice and fight to economic inequality; Zingaretti was supported, among others, by former Prime Minister Paolo Gentiloni, who described him as a "brave candidate who will open a new season for the centre-left" and Dario Franceschini, the former Minister of Culture and leader of AreaDem, one of the main faction of the party.

On 4 October, Senator Matteo Richetti, who between 2017 and 2018 served as Spokesman of the PD, announced his bid for party's leadership. He was a former member of The Daisy (DL) and a close advisor of Matteo Renzi, however he later assumed a more critical view on his premiership. Richetti is considered a centrist and social liberal politician; he is also the leader of Harambee, a PD faction founded in April 2018 with roots in the Christian left.

On 6 October, Cesare Damiano, former Minister of Labour in the second government of Romano Prodi, announced his candidacy as party's secretary. Damiano is a democratic socialist and former trade unionist. He has often been strongly against the policies promoted by the previous party's leadership and he wants to bring back the party on the left-wing. However, on the same day of the announcement, he added that he could withdraw his candidacy, following an agreement with Zingaretti.

On 8 October, Francesco Boccia, an economist and member of the Chamber of Deputies since 2008, presented his candidacy as new party's secretary. Boccia has been a long-time opponent of Renzi and Gentiloni and a close advisor of Michele Emiliano, current governor of Apulia region and former candidate in the 2017 leadership election. Boccia has always supported an alliance between the PD and the Five Star Movement, which was opposed by all the other candidates.

On 18 November 2018, Marco Minniti, the former Italian Minister of the Interior from 2016 to 2018, announced his candidacy as PD's leader. Minniti was a former member of the Italian Communist Party, however while in office, he promoted restricted policies on immigration and social security, for which he has been often criticized by left-wing intellectuals and writers, like Roberto Saviano. Minniti was supported by Matteo Renzi, former Prime Minister and party's leader, who led a liberal and centrist faction within the PD. He was also supported by former Minister of Economic Development, Carlo Calenda, who was considered by many a strong potential candidate for the leadership election, and the former Minister of Economy and Finance, Pier Carlo Padoan.

On 22 November, incumbent Secretary Maurizio Martina presented his candidacy as party's leader. Martina is a social democrat, member of the PD's left-wing, who was elected Secretary after the resignation of Matteo Renzi in March 2018. He also served as Italian Minister of Agriculture in Renzi and Gentiloni's governments. He was supported, among others, by Graziano Delrio, one of party's main bigwigs and former Minister of Infrastructures and Transports, who was very close to Renzi until 2017, but from whom he later distanced himself. One of Martina's main proposals is the introduction of a wealth tax for the so-called "super-rich" people.

On the next day of the Democratic National Committee meeting on 23 November, member of the Chamber of Deputies Lia Quartapelle launched a petition to move up the date of the primary election to January instead of 3 March. The proposal met the support of the former Prime Minister Paolo Gentiloni, Marianna Madia, Carlo Calenda Debora Serracchiani, Pierfrancesco Majorino and the Mayor of Bergamo, Giorgio Gori. Even the candidates Maurizio Martina and Matteo Richetti welcomed the proposal, while Francesco Boccia strongly rejected the idea.

The race was characterized by many withdrawals. On 27 November, Senator Matteo Richetti announced his withdrawal from the race, endorsing Maurizio Martina. The day before his withdrawal, Graziano Delrio, former Minister of Infrastructures and Transports, appealed Richetti on Facebook to endorse Martina's candidacy. Richetti was selected by Martina as his deputy secretary candidate. While, on 5 December, 17 days after having announced his candidacy, Marco Minniti withdrew from the race, saying to do so in order to facilitate the path of the party primaries and with the sole intent to encourage the election of an authoritative secretary; in January 2019, Minniti endorsed Zingaretti. On 11 December, Cesare Damiano withdrew from the race, endorsing Zingaretti, stating that his choice was motivated by a sense of unity and responsibility towards the party.

On the same day Roberto Giachetti and Anna Ascani, with a live footage, announced their joint candidacy asking to their viewers to send them 1,500 signatures by the next day. Giachetti is a former Radical, member of the Chamber of Deputies since 2001 and former centre-left candidate for mayor of Rome in 2016 election, while Ascani is a 31 years old member of the Chamber of Deputies for Umbria. They are both strong supporter of Matteo Renzi, that, after Minniti's retirement, refused to endorse another candidate and decided to run themselves, aiming to represent all the renziani area.

After the National Convention on 3 February, which saw Zingaretti, Martina and Giachetti advanced to the open primary election, Boccia endorsed Zingaretti, while Saladino endorsed Martina.

Debates
There was one leadership election debate held on television.

Candidates

Major candidates

Minor candidates 
 Dario Corallo — Member of the National Secretariat of the Young Democrats (2016–present)
 Maria Saladino — Candidate for the European election of 2014 in the Southern Italy constituency

Endorsements

Nicola Zingaretti

Maurizio Martina

Roberto Giachetti

Former candidates

Withdrawn
Candidacies announced but later aborted
 Matteo Richetti — Member of the Senate of the Republic (2018–present); former Member of the Chamber of Deputies (2013–2018). Announced his intention to run for the party leadership on 4 October but withdrew his candidacy on 27 November, endorsing the incumbent Secretary Maurizio Martina.
 Marco Minniti — former Minister of the Interior (2016–2018); member of the Chamber of Deputies (2018–present; 2001–2013) and former member of the Senate of the Republic (2013–2018). Announced his intention to run for the party leadership on 18 November but withdrew his candidacy on 5 December.
 Cesare Damiano — former Minister of Labour and Social Security (2006–2008); former member of the Chamber of Deputies (2006–2018). Announced his intention to run for the party leadership on 6 October but withdrew his candidacy on 11 December, endorsing Nicola Zingaretti.
Envisaged candidacies
 Riccardo Magi — Member of the Chamber of Deputies (2018–present); Secretary of Italian Radicals (2015–2018). Announced his intention to run on 16 March but did not take further action.

Declined
Carlo Calenda — former Minister of Economic Development (2016–2018); former Permanent Representative of Italy to the European Union (2016). On 11 May declared he was not thinking about running at the primaries.
Graziano Delrio — Member of the Chamber of Deputies (2018–present); former Minister of Infrastructures and Transports (2015–2018); former Secretary of the Council of Ministers (2015–2016); former Minister of Regional Affairs (2013–2014); former Mayor of Reggio Emilia (2004–2013). During an interview on Avvenire on 2 October he said he will not run for the leadership.
 Matteo Renzi — Member of the Senate of the Republic (2018–present); former Secretary of the Democratic Party (2013–2017, 2017–2018); former Prime Minister of Italy (2014–2016); Mayor of Florence (2009–2014); President of the Province of Florence (2004–2009). During an interview on 3 September announced he would not run again.

Opinion polls

Advanced candidates

Before vote by party members

Hypothetical polls

Results

Vote by party members

Primary election

Delegates summary

Aftermath
According to Il Post, the results of the popular vote were suspected of being "almost impossible on a statistical level", given that all three resulting percentages for each candidate are perfectly rounded numbers. The editorial staff of Il Post tried to contact the Democratic Party National Committee for further explanations but no answer was ever given.

References

2019 elections in Italy
Democratic Party (Italy)
Political party leadership elections in Italy
Democratic Party (Italy) leadership election